Statistics of Swedish football Division 3 for the 1944–45 season.

League standings

Uppsvenska Sydöstra 1944–45

Uppsvenska Sydvästra 1944–45

Östsvenska Norra 1944–45

Östsvenska Södra 1944–45

Centralserien Norra, Uppland 1944–45

Centralserien Norra, Västmanland 1944–45

Centralserien Södra 1944–45

Nordvästra Norra 1944–45

Nordvästra Södra, Dalsland 1944–45

Nordvästra Södra, Bohus 1944–45

Mellansvenska Norra 1944–45

Mellansvenska Södra 1944–45

Sydöstra Norra 1944–45

Sydöstra Södra 1944–45

Västsvenska Norra 1944–45

Västsvenska Södra 1944–45

Sydsvenska Norra 1944–45

Sydsvenska Södra 1944–45

Footnotes

References 

Swedish Football Division 3 seasons
3
Swed